Thaw Hill is a cinder cone in northwestern British Columbia, Canada. It is one of the volcanoes in the central portion of the Mount Edziza volcanic complex and last erupted during the Pleistocene period.

See also
List of volcanoes in Canada
List of Northern Cordilleran volcanoes
Volcanology of Canada
Volcanology of Western Canada

References

Northern Cordilleran Volcanic Province
Pleistocene volcanoes